The Oratory of San Bovo is a Roman Catholic prayer hall located on via Del Torresino #4 in Padua, region of Veneto, Italy.

History
The oratory was established in 1505, with the dedication to San Bovo (Saint Bobo) beginning in 1623 - 1630, when it was introduced by the dalla fraglia dei Bovai. It was moved to the present location in 1908, and the artwork was restored in the 1950s. It maintains most of the original artwork, including frescoes. The building now houses the Chamber Orchestra of Padua.

During the move, and altarpiece by Bissoni and a polyptych by Sebastiano Florigerio, were lost.

The chapter house of the confraternity has a wooden ceiling with framed units (cassettoni). The frescoes on the wall were painted by Sebastiano Florigerio, Domenico Campagnola, Stefano Dall’Arzere, and presumably Lamberto Sustris, and depict the Life and Passion of Christ. The canvases from the ground-floor were moved to the Church del Torresino in front of the oratory. Two Depostions in the oratory are attributed respectively to Florigerio and Campagnola.

Other works here are from the church of the Torresino, are by unknown artists including:
Visitation (18th century)
Knight San Bovo with kneeling villager (19th century)
Madonna appears to St Bovo (19th century)
Madonna in Glory with Saints (18th century)
Christ (17th century)
St Antony of Padua, half-figure (18th century)
Birth of Christ attributed to Ludovico di Vernassal
Portrait of Priest (19th century)
Madonna and Child (19th century)
Holy Family (19th century)
Birth of the Virgin by Ludovico di Vernassal
Adoration of the Shepherds by Giulio Girello and retouched by L. 
Padua pleads for Liberation from the Plague by Francesco Zanella 
St Christopher and Christ Child with St Francis of Paola (18th century)

References

Guida di Padova e dei principali suoi contorni, by Pietro Selvatico,(1869), pages 216–217.

Roman Catholic churches in Padua
1505 establishments in Italy
17th-century Roman Catholic church buildings in Italy